The Madagascan friar (Amauris nossima) is a species of nymphalid butterfly in the Danainae subfamily. It is found on the Comoros, Madagascar and Mayotte. The habitat consists of forests.

References
Seitz, A. Die Gross-Schmetterlinge der Erde 13: Die Afrikanischen Tagfalter. Plate XIII 23 d

Sources

Amauris
Butterflies described in 1870
Taxonomy articles created by Polbot
Butterflies of Africa
Taxa named by Christopher Ward (entomologist)